Crni Vrh (English Black Peak) is a mountain in eastern Bosnia and Herzegovina, near Zvornik. A mass grave containing  Bosniak victims of the Bosnian War was uncovered on mountain slope near Snagovo.

Mass grave

A mass grave containing 629 Bosniak victims, killed by Serb forces during the Bosnian War, was uncovered on Crni Vrh in 2003.

References

Mountains of Bosnia and Herzegovina
Zvornik